A street gutter is a depression that runs parallel to a road and is designed to collect rainwater that flows along the street diverting it into a storm drain. A gutter alleviates water buildup on a street, allows pedestrians to pass without walking through puddles, and reduces the risk of hydroplaning by road vehicles. When a curbstone is present, a gutter may be formed by the convergence of the road surface and the vertical face of the sidewalk; otherwise, a dedicated gutter surface made of concrete may be present. Depending on local regulations, a gutter usually discharges, as a nonpoint pollution source in a storm drain whose final discharge falls into a detention pond (in order to remove some pollutants by sedimentation) or into a body of water. Street gutters are most often found in areas of a city which have high pedestrian traffic. In rural areas, gutters are seldom used and are frequently replaced by a borrow ditch.

In past centuries, when urban streets did not have sanitary sewers, street gutters were made deep enough to serve that purpose as well; responsibility for operation and maintenance of the dual-purpose street gutter was cooperatively shared between the local government and the inhabitants.

A now obsolete word meaning a street gutter is a kennel.

See also
Road debris
Street sweeper
Pervious concrete

References

Road infrastructure